The red-tinged myzomela (Myzomela rubrotincta) is a species of bird in the family Meliphagidae. It was formerly considered a subspecies of the dusky myzomela (	Myzomela obscura), but was split as a distinct species by the IOC in 2021. It is found in the Maluku Islands. Its natural habitat is subtropical or tropical moist lowland forests.

References

Red-tinged myzomela
Birds of the Maluku Islands
Red-tinged myzomela
Red-tinged myzomela